The Logic is a subscription-based Canadian news outlet focused on the "innovation economy," which has been compared to The Information.

History 
The website was founded in June 2018 by David Skok, who was previously associate editor for Toronto Star, managing editor and vice-president of digital for the Boston Globe, and director of digital for Global News.

When the website was first launched, Moira Weigel, co-founder and editor of Logic, an American technology magazine launched in March 2017, took issue with the similarity of the names.

Activities 
The Logic has extensive reporting on business in Canada, most notably their reporting on Sidewalk Labs and their Waterfront Toronto project. Their reporting is paywalled, and requires a subscription starting at $300. In May 2019, Postmedia acquired a minor stake in The Logic, and began to republish stories on the Financial Post's website and newspaper, along with advertising the news outlets subscriptions.

References

External links
The Logic Website

Canadian news websites
2018 establishments in Canada
Companies based in Toronto
2018 establishments in Ontario